Paecilomyces variotii is a common environmental mold that is widespread in composts, soils and food products. It is known from substrates including food, indoor air, wood, soil and carpet dust. Paecilomyces variotii is the asexual state of Byssochlamys spectabilis, a member of the Phylum Ascomycota (Family Trichocomaceae). However, the Byssochlamys state is rarely observed in culture due to the heterothallic nature of this species (i.e., it requires culturing of positive and negative strains in co-culture to produce the teleomorph). Paecilomyces variotii is fast growing, producing powdery to suede-like colonies that are yellow-brown or sand-colored. It is distinguishable from microscopically similar microfungi, such as the biverticillate members of the genus Penicillium (affiliated with the genus Talaromyces) by its broadly ellipsoidal to lemon-shaped conidia, loosely branched conidiophores and phialides with pointed tips. Ascospores of the sexual state, B. spectabilis, are strongly heat-resistant. As such, the fungus is a common contaminant of heat-treated foods and juices. It is also known from decaying wood and creosote-treated wood utility poles. Paecilomyces variotii has been associated with a number of infective diseases of humans and animals. It is also an important indoor environmental contaminant.

Morphology
The colonies are usually flat, powdery to suede-like and funiculose or tufted. The color is initially white, and becomes yellow, yellow-brown, or sand-colored as they mature. A sweet aromatic odor may be associated with older cultures. Colonies of P. variotii are fast growing and mature within 3 days. Colonies grown on Sabouraud's dextrose agar reach about 7–8 mm after one week. Colonies on CYA are flat, floccose in texture, produce brown or olive brown from conidia, and range in diameter from 30-79 mmn in one week.  Colonies on malt extract agar reach 70 mm diameter or more, otherwise very similar in appearance to those on CYA. Colonies on G25N media reach 8–16 mm diameter, similar to on CYA but with predominantly white mycelium. Microscopically, the spore-bearing structures of P. variotii consist of a loosely branched, irregularly brush-like conidiophores with phialides at the tips. The phialides are swollen at the base, and gradually taper to a sharp point at the tip. Conidia are single-celled, hyaline, and are borne in chains with the youngest at the base. Chlamydospores (thick-walled vegetative resting structures) are occasionally produced singly or in short chains.

Genetics
This fungus is heterothallic, and mating experiments have shown that P. variotii can form ascomata and ascospores in culture when compatible mating types are present. The teleomorph of P. variotii, Byssochlamys spectabilis, is rarely observed in cultures from environmental or clinical specimens, which tend to be colonized by a single mating type. The genome sequences of two isolates of P. variotii of opposite mating type have been generated.

Ecology
This species is thermophilic, able to grow at high temperatures as high as 50–60 °C. It can withstand brief exposures of up to 15 min at 80–100 °C. Accordingly, it typically causes spoilage of food products following pasteurization or other heat-treatments (e.g., curry sauces, fruit juices). It also has been reported as a contaminant in salami and margarine. The fungus is known from a number of non-food items including compost, rubber, glue, urea-formaldehyde foam insulation and creosote-treated wooden poles. The combination of its ability to survive significant heat stress and its ability to break-down aromatic hydrocarbons has led to interest in P. variotii as a potential candidate organism to assist in bioremediation.

Health significance
Although frequently encountered as a contaminant in clinical specimens, P. variotii is an uncommon causative agent of human and animal infections, but is considered to be an emerging agent of opportunistic disease, particularly in immunocompromised individuals. It has been suggested that the extremotolerant nature of the fungus contributes to its pathogenic potential. Pneumonia due to P. variotii has been reported, albeit rarely, in the medical literature. Most cases are known from diabetics or individuals subject to long-term corticosteroid treatment for other diseases. P. variotii has also been reported as a causative agent of sinusitis, endophthalmitis, wound infection following tissue transplant, cutaneous hyalohyphomycosis, onychomycosis, osteomyelitis, otitis media and dialysis-related peritonitis. It has also been reported from mastitis in a goat, and as an agent of mycotic infections of dogs and horses.  Besides clinical samples, the fungus is a common contaminant of moisture-damaged materials in the indoor environment including carpet, plaster and wood. It is commonly found in indoor air samples and may contribute to indoor allergy. This species produces the mycotoxin viriditoxin, via the action of six enzymes encoded within a cluster of genes within the genome.

References

Fungi described in 1907
Trichocomaceae